Manila is both a given name and a surname. Notable people with this name include:

Given names
Manila Esposito (born 2006), Italian gymnast
Manila Flamini (born 1987), Italian synchronised swimmer
Manila Nazzaro (born 1977), Italian model
Manila Sotang, Nepali singer
Manila Davis Talley (1898-1973), American pilot

Surnames
Gabriel Janer Manila (born 1940), Spanish writer

See also
Manila Luzon (stage name for Karl Philip Michael Westerberg), American drag queen

Italian feminine given names
Spanish-language surnames